RauteMusik (also RM or #Musik) is an internet radio station based in Germany. RauteMusik was first broadcast on 20 April 2003 with just one main stream. In the next four years, RauteMusik established itself as one of Europe's biggest internet radio stations. Currently up to 37,000 people listen to RauteMusik simultaneously.

RauteMusik Streams 
RauteMusik currently has 40 different radio streams:

 Musik.Top40: Chart Hits
 Musik.Main: 80s, Pop, Rock, Charts and new Hits
Musik.ChartHits: Pop, R'n'B, Dance, Electro
Musik.Club: Dance, HandsUp, Techno, Trance
Musik.Rock: Rock, Alternative, Punk
Musik.Metal: Metal, Heavy Metal, Metalcore, Grindcore
Musik.JaM: HipHop, R’n’B, Rap, Reggae, Soul, Urban
Musik.Happy: Feel Good Music
Musik.Party: Party Hits
Musik.Workout: 130BPM Beats
Musik.Deutschrap: German Hip-Hop & Rap
Musik.House: House, Dance, Electro
LoveHits.FM: Love Songs and Kuschelsongs
Musik.Goldies: Oldies, 60s, 70s, 80s
Musik.Lounge: Ambient, Jazz, Downtempo, Chillout
Musik.HardeR: Hardstyle, Hardcore, Jumpstyle, Schranz
Musik.BigCityBeats: House, Electro
Musik.Oriental: Arabian Music
Musik.Schlager: German Schlager, Discofox
Musik.DrumStep: Drum & Bass, Dubstep
Musik.Christmas: Christmas and Holiday Songs
Musik.Trance: Trance, Vocal Trance, Uplifting
Musik.Solo Piano: Piano Composers
Musik.HappyHardcore: Happy Hardcore and UK Hardcore
Musik.Country: Country, Western, Americana
Musik.12Punk: Punk Rock, Ska, Hardcore
Musik.Kids: Kindermusik, Kinderpop
Musik.Study: Lo-Fi
Musik.Salsa: Salsa, Latino, Tropical
Musik.Trap: Trap, Glitch Hop, Moombahton
Musik.TechHouse: Tech House, Minimal
Musik.90s: 90s, Eurodance
Musik.Sex:
Musik.Traurig: Loneliness, Sadness
DAS Coachingradio: Easy Listening, Coaching
WackenRadio.Com: Metal from the Wacken Open Air Festivals
BreakZ.FM: Mixtapes, Hip Hop, Dance

The streams are offered in three formats – MP3 SHOUTcast 128kbit/s, MP3 SHOUTcast 48 kbit/s, and aacPlus in vbr bitrate of 40-56kbit/s

References

External links 
 Internetradio RauteMusik.FM

Internet radio in Germany